The Minister for the Community and Voluntary Sector is a minister in the government of New Zealand. The minister oversees the government's relationship to the community and voluntary sector and the services they provide. The minister is also responsible for the New Zealand Office for the Community & Voluntary Sector.

List of Ministers
Key

References

Community
Public office-holders in New Zealand
Community